"He's My Sunny Boy" is a song performed by Diana Ross & the Supremes, written and produced by Smokey Robinson. Originally, the composition was released on the group's 1968 album, Love Child and later as a b-side on the Supremes' final single to feature Diana Ross, "Someday We'll Be Together." The song is notable for being one of few releases during the late 1960s to feature the entire ensemble group as opposed to session singers The Andantes, who sometimes, but not always, filled in for Wilson and Birdsong on recordings after the departure of Florence Ballard.

Credits
Lead vocals by Diana Ross
Background vocals by Mary Wilson and Cindy Birdsong
Instrumentation by The Funk Brothers

References

1969 songs
The Supremes songs
Songs written by Smokey Robinson
Motown singles
Song recordings produced by Smokey Robinson